Anthene rubricinctus, the indigo ciliate blue, is a butterfly in the family Lycaenidae. It is found in Guinea, Sierra Leone, Liberia, Ivory Coast, Ghana, Togo, Nigeria, Cameroon, the Republic of the Congo, Gabon, Angola, the Democratic Republic of the Congo, Uganda, Kenya, Tanzania, Malawi and Zambia. The habitat consists of forest, especially stream banks.

Adults of both sexes are attracted to flowers and males sometimes mud-puddle.

The larvae feed on the flowers of Pterocarpus esculenta.

Subspecies
Anthene rubricinctus rubricinctus (Guinea, Sierra Leone, Liberia, Ivory Coast, Ghana, Togo, Nigeria: west, east and the Cross River loop, Cameroon, Congo, Gabon, Democratic Republic of the Congo: Mongala, Uele, Ituri, Kivu, Tshuapa, Equateur and Sankuru) 
Anthene rubricinctus anadema (Druce, 1905) (Angola, Democratic Republic of the Congo: south to Shaba, Tanzania, Malawi, northern Zambia)
Anthene rubricinctus jeanneli Stempffer, 1961 (eastern Democratic Republic of the Congo, Uganda, western Kenya, northern Tanzania)

References

Butterflies described in 1891
Anthene
Butterflies of Africa